Visions is the debut EP by American metalcore band Atreyu. It is a seven-track EP and was released during 1999 although the exact release date is unknown, as no confirmation on the EP's release date has been made. It is suspected that the EP was sold at the band's local shows and, as a result, is currently very difficult to find. It was released through Die Trying Records, a Yorba Linda, California independent label. As heard on this EP, much of their earlier sound is influenced by hardcore punk music. Unlike every other Atreyu album, Brandon Saller does not sing on the album in addition to playing drums.

Track listing

Personnel
Atreyu
Alex Varkatzas - vocals
Dan Jacobs - guitars
Brandon Saller - drums
Brian O'Donnell - bass (on tracks 1, 5, 6 and 7)
Kyle Stanley - bass (on tracks 2, 3 and 4)

Additional personnel
Daniel Lewis - backing vocals
Scott Lloyd - backing vocals, photography
Alex Varkatzas - lyrics, album artwork and layout
Kevin Chapman - album artwork and layout

Atreyu (band) albums
1998 debut EPs